José María Bustamante (March 19, 1777, Toluca – December 4, 1861, Mexico City) was a Mexican composer.

Bustamante worked at various churches in Mexico City as a chapel master, his last posting being at the Metropolitan Cathedral. Active in the Mexican independence movement, he taught at the first conservatory in Latin America, which was founded in Mexico in 1824. He was best known for his heroic melodrama Méjico libre (Free Mexico), besides which he also wrote an opera and church music.

References 

1777 births
1861 deaths
Mexican male classical composers
Mexican classical composers
Mexican Romantic composers
People from Toluca
19th-century classical composers
Mexican independence activists
19th-century male musicians
19th-century musicians